Trigonopterus fissitarsis is a species of flightless weevil in the genus Trigonopterus from Indonesia.

Etymology
The specific name is derived from the Latin word fissus, meaning "cleft", and the Greek word tarsos, plural of "ankle".

Description
Individuals measure 2.04–2.14 mm in length.  The body is slightly oval in shape.  General coloration black, with rust-colored antennae and dark rust-colored legs.

Range
The species is found around elevations of  near Lake Ranamese on the island of Flores, part of the Indonesian province of East Nusa Tenggara.

Phylogeny
T. fissitarsis is part of the T. saltator species group.

References

fissitarsis
Beetles described in 2014
Beetles of Asia
Insects of Indonesia